Military security implies the capability of a nation-state to defend itself, and/or deter military aggression. Alternatively, military security implies the capability of a nation-state to enforce its policy choices by use of military force. The term "military security" is considered synonymous with "security" in much of its usage. One of the definitions of security given in the Dictionary of Military and Associated Terms, may be considered a definition of "military security":

This is traditionally, the earliest recognised form of national security. The scope of military security has expanded from conventional forms of conflict between nation-states to fourth-generation warfare between a state and non-state actors.

References

National security
Political terminology